Gulder Ultimate Search (also called GUS) is a Nigerian reality television series, created and sponsored by Nigerian Breweries Plc to promote the Gulder Lager Beer. The first season premiered in 2004. The GUS series is also the very first 100% local content reality television programme in Nigeria and it is a survival type reality programme that highlights the struggle of Contestants (10–30 persons, depending on the reference edition), their struggles against themselves and the wild i.e. nature and their search for a hidden treasure that brings to the last person standing instant fame and fortune. The Winner of the last season in 2014 took home a 10 million naira cash prize and an SUV.

After 7 years off TV, Gulder Ultimate Search returned to the television screen in year 2021.

Past seasons, locations, storylines and winners
The series is produced by a Nigerian-based producer, Olakunle Oyeneye and Executive Producer Oluseyi Siwoku of Jungle Filmworks.

GUS 1
GUS 1 was produced on the Snake Island in Lagos State. The theme was 'The Legend of Captain Kush' and the Mr. Ezeugo Egwuagwu made history as the first winner of the reality show took home the Star Prize of 3 Million Naira.

GUS 2
Obudu Hills, Calabar Cross River played host to the 2nd Season 'The Lost Helmet of General Maxmllian' and Mr. Lucan Chambliss took home the Star Prize of 5 Million Naira.

GUS 3
NIFOR, Benin Edo State was the venue of 'The Brew Master's Secret' (Season 3) and Mr. Hector Joberteh won the grand prize of 5 Million Naira and a Ford Explorer SUV. The now deceased Hector was shot dead at his apartment in Lagos on the morning of 3 September 2017.

GUS 4
The Shere Hills of Jos was the venue of 'The Search for the Golden Age' and the athletic Dominic Mudabai outpaced his contemporaries to claim the title that year.

Death of contestant
A contestant Anthony Ogadje, drowned in a lake in Jos Plateau State in GUS 4 during the shoot.

GUS 5
In the stormy hills of Mmaku in Awgu, Enugu. Mr Michael Nwachukwu found 'The Lost Chronicle' and exchanged it for the 5 million naira and a brand new SUV.

GUS 6
GUS 6 was taken to the western part of Nigeria in the deserted Omodo Forest of Aagba in Osun State and 'The Horn of Valour' was found by Mr. Uche Nwaezeapu.

Celebrity showdown
The celebrity edition was the GUS series was launched in 2010 and location was La Campaigne Tropicana, Epe, Lagos. 'The Golden Goblet' was found by the Ace Nollywood Actor Emeka Ike and he goes home with the sum of seven million naira.

GUS 7
In the same year when the Celebrity Edition was done, the GUS series moved to Omo Forest, J4 Ogun State for season 7 and 'The Ultimate Hero' was Mr. Oyekunle Oluwaremi.

GUS 8
The Kukuruku Hills, Egbetua Quarters in Ososo,  Akoko-Edo Edo State won't recover from 'The Contest of Champions' when Mr. Chris Okagbue stunned the world by winning the 8th season.

GUS 9
2012 was the year that the search moved to Usaka, Obot Akara, Akwa Ibom where 'The Gatekeeper's Fortune' was found by Paschal Eronmose Ojezele. GUS 9 was directed by Laszlo Bene, the American Director/Producer currently living in South  Africa .

GUS 10
In the forest of Usaka, Akwa Ibom, Mr. Dennis Okike found 'The Tenth Symbol' and exchanged it for the 10 million naira and a brand new Mitsubishi Pajero. GUS 10 was directed by Laszlo Bene, the American Director/Producer currently living in South Africa

GUS 11
GUS 11 was in Aguleri forest in Anambra state, where 'The General's Helmet' was found by Chinedu Ubachukwu. He was rewarded with 10 million naira and a brand new Ford Explorer car.

New season

GUS 12: The Age of Craftmanship 
Gulder Ultimate search returned to the television screen after 7 years, with the last season airing in 2014. The new season started running from October 16, 2021, and will be on Air up until December 19, 2021, on Saturdays and Sundays from 8pm to 9pm.
18 Contestants were unveiled for Gulder Ultimate Search season 12 which includes Damola Johnson, a 26-year-old Film director from Lagos, Mfon Mikel Esin, a 27-year-old Freelance writer from Akwa Ibom, Samuel Ishmael, 35-year old IT Expert from Ogun, Emmanuel Nnebe, 29-year old Paralegal from Anambra, Damilola Odedina, 25-year old Cinematographer, Solomon Yankari, 26-year old fitness Fitness Instructor from Bauchi, Olayinka Omoya, Godswill Oboh, Omokhafe Bello, Chidimma Okeibe, Jennifer Okorie, Tobechukwu Okoye, Gerald Odeka, Tosin Michael Emiola, Iniabasi Umoren.

Celebrity OAP, Toke Makinwa was selected as the anchor for the 12th season, while season 7 winner, Kunle Remi was chosen as the taskmaster.

References

External links
 Gulder Ultimate Search
 Gulder Ultimate Search 5 winner from Naijapals
 The Ultimate Man
 

Nigerian reality television series